Li Ziyang (born September 23, 1996) is a Chinese male acrobatic gymnast. Along with his partner, Zhang Shaolong, he finished 5th in the 2014 Acrobatic Gymnastics World Championships.

References

1996 births
Living people
Chinese acrobatic gymnasts
Male acrobatic gymnasts